The 1956 All-SEC football team consists of American football players selected to the All-Southeastern Conference (SEC) chosen by various selectors for the 1956 NCAA University Division football season. Tennessee won the conference.

All-SEC selections

Ends
Buddy Cruze, Tennessee (AP, UP-1)
Ron Bennett, Miss. St. (AP, UP-1)
Jimmy Phillips, Auburn (UP-2)
Roger Urbana, Tennessee (UP-2)
Roy Wilkins, Georgia (UP-3)
Bob Laws, Vanderbilt (UP-3)

Tackles
Lou Michaels, Kentucky (College Football Hall of Fame)  (AP, UP-1)
Billy Yelverton, Ole Miss (AP, UP-2)
Carl Vereen, Georgia Tech (UP-2)
Earl Leggett, LSU (UP-3)
J. T. Frankenberger, Kentucky (UP-3)

Guards
John Gordy, Tennessee (AP, UP-1 [as T])
John Barrow, Florida (AP, UP-1)
Allen Ecker, Georgia Tech (UP-1)
Ernest Danjean, Auburn (UP-2)
Jimmy Johnson, Georgia Tech (UP-2)
Tony Cushenberry, Georgia (UP-3)
Charles Duck, Ole Miss (UP-3)

Centers
Don Stephenson, Georgia Tech (AP, UP-1)
Bobby Howe, Tennessee (UP-2)
Dave Kuhn, Kentucky (UP-3)

Quarterbacks
Billy Stacy, Miss. St. (AP, UP-1)
Gene Newton, Tulane (UP-2)
Wade Mitchell, Georgia Tech (UP-3)

Halfbacks 
Johnny Majors, Tennessee (College Football Hall of Fame)  (AP, UP-1)
Phil King, Vanderbilt (UP-1)
Paul Rotenberry, Georgia Tech (UP-2)
Jackie Simpson, Florida (UP-2)
George Volkert, Georgia Tech (UP-3)
Tommy Lorine, Auburn (UP-3)

Fullbacks
Paige Cothren, Ole Miss (AP, UP-1)
Ken Owen, Georgia Tech (AP, UP-3)
Ronnie Quillian, Tulane (UP-2)

Key

AP = Associated Press

UP = United Press

Bold = Consensus first-team selection by both AP and UP

See also
1956 College Football All-America Team

References

All-SEC
All-SEC football teams